Jabrin, also known as Jabreen, is a small town in Ad Dakhiliyah Governorate in northeastern Oman near Nizwa and the Jabal Akhdar Mountains. 

The town is known for its impressive castle, which was built by the Yaruba dynasty Imam Bil'arab bin Sultan, who ruled from 1679 to 1692 and who was buried onsite. The castle can be visited independently with an audio guide that is provided at the entrance and which lasts about 25 minutes.

Climate

See also
 List of cities in Oman

References

Gallery

External links 
 ArchNet
 Jabreen Castle, the very impressive castle in Oman

Populated places in Oman
Ad Dakhiliyah Governorate